The Blue Veil (French: Le voile bleu) is a 1942 French drama film directed by Jean Stelli and starring Gaby Morlay, Elvire Popesco and André Alerme. The film was remade in 1951.

Cast
 Gaby Morlay as Louise Jarraud 
 Elvire Popesco as Mona Lorenza 
 André Alerme as Ernest Volnar-Bussel  
 Fernand Charpin as Émile Perrette 
 Aimé Clariond as Le juge d'instruction 
 Pierre Larquey as Antoine Lancelot 
 Marcelle Géniat as Madame Breuilly 
 Georges Grey as Gérard Volnar-Bussel 
 Jeanne Fusier-Gir as Mademoiselle Eugénie 
 Renée Devillers as Madame Forneret 
 Denise Grey as Madame Volnar-Bussel 
 Francine Bessy as La jeune danseuse 
 Jean Clarieux as Henri Forneret 
 Pierre Jourdan as Dominique 
 Camille Bert as Le médecin 
 Noël Roquevert as L'inspecteur Duval
 Marcel Vallée as L'imprésario de Mona Lorenza 
 Jean Bobillot as Julien 
 Mona Dol as L'infirmière-chef 
 Camille Guérini as d'Aubigny 
 Marthe Mellot as Une commère 
 Primerose Perret as Georgette Volnar-Bucel 
 Michel de Bonnay as Pierre Breuilly  
 Monique Bourdette as Une petite fille  
 Pierre Brulé as Un petit garçon  
 Jean Fay as L'imprésario étranger 
 Raymonde La Fontan as Lotte Lorenza 
 Odette Barencey as Une commère  
 Paul Barge 
 Liliane Bert 
 Paul Demange as Pons  
 Michel François
 Marcelle Monthil as Une commère
 Noëlle Norman as Madame Berger, la directrice du bureau de placement 
 Jacques Ory as Un jeune garçon  
 Julienne Paroli as La concierge

References

Bibliography 
 Dayna Oscherwitz & MaryEllen Higgins. The A to Z of French Cinema. Scarecrow Press, 2009.

External links 

1942 films
French drama films
1942 drama films
1940s French-language films
Films directed by Jean Stelli
Films set in 1914
French black-and-white films
1940s French films